The president of the Republic of Costa Rica is the head of state and head of government of Costa Rica. The president is currently elected in direct elections for a period of four years, which is not immediately renewable. Two vice presidents are elected in the same ticket with the president. The president appoints the Council of Ministers. Due to the abolition of the military of Costa Rica in 1948, the president is not a commander-in-chief, unlike the norm in most other countries, although the Constitution does describe him as commander-in-chief of the civil defense public forces.

From 1969 to 2005, the president was barred from seeking reelection. After the amendment banning reelection was overturned by the Supreme Court in 2005, an incumbent president became eligible to run again after waiting for at least eight years after leaving office.

Election
The President of Costa Rica is elected using a modified two-round system in which a candidate must receive at least 40% of the vote to win in the first round; if no candidate wins in the first round, a runoff is held between the two candidates with the largest number of votes.

Qualifications
According to Article 131 of the Constitution, The following is required to be president or vice president of the Republic:

Attributes and duties
According to article 139 of the Constitution of Costa Rica, the following powers are exclusive attributes of the president:

Article 140 gives the president the following duties alongside the respective minister:

Limitations
The Constitution also establishes limitations on the president's powers which can be prosecuted if broken.

Article 148.

Article 149

List of presidents of Costa Rica

Latest election

See also
List of presidents of Costa Rica
Politics of Costa Rica
List of political parties in Costa Rica
History of Costa Rica

References

 
1848 establishments in Costa Rica